Pir is a commune of 1,780 inhabitants situated in Satu Mare County, Crișana, Romania. It is composed of three villages: Pir, Piru Nou (Kispér) and Sărvăzel (Peleszarvad).

Demographics
Ethnic groups (2002 census): 
Hungarians: 54.77%
Romanians: 36.40%
Romanies (Gypsies): 8.81%

According to mother tongue, 60.71% of the population speak Hungarian, while 39.11% speak Romanian as their first language.

References

Communes in Satu Mare County
Localities in Crișana